Spinifex may refer to:
 Spinifex (coastal grass), a genus of grasses growing on coastal dunes in Asia and Australasia
 Triodia (plant), a genus of grasses of inland Australia, commonly known as spinifexes
 Spinifex, a texture in certain ultramafic lavas such as komatiite

See also 
 Spinifex people, an Aboriginal Australian people, inhabitants of the Spinifex country
 Spinifex resin, a type of gum
 Spinifex hopping mouse, a mouse native to the central and western Australian arid zones
 Spinifex pigeon (Geophaps plumifera), a bird found in Australia
 Spinifexbird (Eremiornis carteri), a bird found in Australia
 Spinifex Ridge mine, a mine in Australia
 Spinifex Gum, an Australian musical group